Domenico Colla was an 18th-century Brescian composer and performer who traveled Europe in the 1760s, performing in the most important theaters and salons. Together with his brother Giuseppe, he was one of the Signori Colla, or the Colla brothers. The brothers played in royal circles; they performed before Frederick the Great in 1765 in the palace at Sanssouci. They were in London in 1766, where it was advertised that they had performed before the British royalty, as well as other the royal families of Europe.  The brothers were also noted for being survivors of slavery in Algiers, rescued from it by the King of Poland.

The brothers played the colascione and colascioncino and guitar. Domenico's name is attached to six sonatas for the smaller colascioncino.

The cocolascione was a long-necked lute (strings 100 –130 cm), possibly related to the dutar or tanbur. The colascioncino was tuned an octave higher with strings 50–60 cm long. The instruments can have two or three strings. According to the advertisement, the brothers played the two string variety.

Domenico composed music, and his six sonatas for the colascioncino may be the only works that have survived for that instrument. Each sonata lists either the colascioncino or colascioncino of two strings.

Works
Six Colascioncino Sonatas The sonatas are set up with the colascioncino playing the melody, accompanied by a bass-ranged instrument, the colascione.
Sonata in G major
Sonata in G major
Sonata in D major
Sonata in E major
Sonata in E-flat major
Sonata in F major

References

External links

British Museum, drawing from 1749 by Ghezzi that preceded the later 1752 engraving by Oesterreich.
RISM page for Domenico Colla; has link to pages about his works.
Record for Colla's sonatas in Dresden library.
RISM page for Colla's sonatas.

18th-century Italian composers
18th-century Italian male musicians